A rope pump is a kind of pump where a loose hanging rope is lowered into a well and drawn up through a long pipe with the bottom immersed in water.  On the rope, round disks or knots matching the diameter of the pipe are attached which pull the water to the surface.  It is commonly used in developing countries for both community supply and self-supply of water and can be installed on boreholes or hand-dug wells.

Description

A rope pump is a type of pump of which the main or most visible component is a continuous piece of rope, in which the rope is integral in raising water from a well. Rope pumps are often used in developing areas, the most common design of which uses PVC pipe and a rope with flexible or rigid valves.  Rope pumps are cheap to build and easy to maintain. One design of rope pump using a solar-powered rope pump can pump 3,000 litres to 15 meters per day using an 80 watt solar panel. Rope pumps can be powered by low speed gasoline/diesel engines, electricity, human energy, wind and solar energy.

History
Chain or washer pumps were used by the Chinese over 1000 years ago. In the 1980s Reinder van Tijen an inventor and grass roots activist, with the support of the Royal Tropical Institute of Amsterdam, created and began instructing various communities around the world how to make a rope pump from simple available parts using PVC pipes and plastic moldings. He began at Burkina Faso in Africa, continued to Tunisia, Thailand and Gambia among others. In Nicaragua, the technology was introduced around 1985 and by 2010 there were an estimated 70.000 pumps installed. An estimated 20.000 were installed  on wells for rural communal water supply and over 25% of the rural water supply was with rope pumps. The other 50.000 pumps were installed on private wells of rural families and farmers, partly or completely paid for by families themselves, (so called Self-supply). Many rope pumps are now being replaced by electric pumps so families climb "the water ladder". It is also used in other parts of Central America with over 25,000 pumps installed to date. In Africa the improved model of the rope pump was introduced around 1995 but in many countries failed due to the use of outdated designs and lack of long term follow up on quality in production and installation. See als article 130.000 rope pumps worldwide. by Haanen, R. By the 2020 an estimated 5 million people in 20 countries worldwide were using rope pumps for domestic uses and small scale irrigation.

Construction 
The original rope pumps used knots along the rope length but can be made with flexible or rigid valves on the rope instead of knots. Alternatively they may use only rope, simply relying on the water clinging to the rope as it is quickly pulled to the surface.

Flexible valve rope pumps 
Flexible valves can be made from cut pieces of bicycle wheel tubing. The valves are positioned approximately 20 cm apart on the rope. One disadvantage of flexible valve rope pumps is that they must be appropriately sized and thickness for different types, sizes and length of pipes.

Rigid valve rope pump 
Rigid valves using plastic or metal washers that fit tightly into the PVC pipe as the rope is dragged through are also used. If the fit is tight, the washers can be spaced up to half a meter apart. The deeper the well, the smaller the pipe inner diameter must be, given the available power constraints.  These rope pumps are often worked with a hand crank

Valves can also be made from knots in the rope itself.

Valveless rope pumps 
Valveless pumps rely on friction with water clinging to the rope, which is moved at high speed, often using a bicycle to produce the required speed.  It is a less efficient design but is simpler to construct than the other rope pumps.

Intellectual property 
Rope pump technology is in the public domain and there are no patents pending on it.

See also
 Chain pump
 Wind pump

References

External links
 rope pump site
 Rope pump
 Akvopedia Rope Pump article
 

Pumps